Anthropos (ἄνθρωπος) is Greek for human.

Anthropos may also refer to:

 Anthropos, in Gnosticism, the first human being, also referred to as Adamas (from Hebrew meaning earth) or Geradamas
 ′Anthropos′ as a part of an expression in the original Greek New Testament that is translated as Son of man 
 Anthropos (journal), a journal published since 1906 by the 
 The Archives of Anthropos, a series of fantasy novels for children
 Anthropos (robot), a social robot developed by Media Lab Europe

See also
 Anthropoid (disambiguation)
 Anthropology